VPS35L is a gene encoding the VPS35 Endosomal Protein Sorting Factor Like protein.

References

External links

Further reading 

Human proteins